Acacia echinula, commonly known as hedgehog wattle, is a shrub belonging to the genus Acacia and the subgenus Phyllodineae that is endemic to New South Wales.

When it blooms it produces yellow coloured flowers.

It is found in eastern parts of New South Wales from around Nowra in the south to Grafton in the north on hills and plains in sandy soils often over sandstone as a part of dry sclerophyll forest communities.

See also
 List of Acacia species

References

echinula
Flora of New South Wales
Plants described in 1825
Taxa named by Augustin Pyramus de Candolle